Eleutherodactylus rhodesi (common name: Rhodes' robber frog) is a species of frog in the family Eleutherodactylidae. It is endemic to Haiti, where it is only known from the area of its type locality on northeastern base of the Presqu'ile du Nord-Ouest, near Port-de-Paix, Nord-Ouest department.

Etymology
The specific name rhodesi honors S. Craig Rhodes, one of the companions of Albert Schwartz when he was collecting near Port-de-Paix.

Description
The snout is truncate. The tympanum is visible. The fingers and toes have no webbing and lack discs. Skin is smooth. The dorsum is olive, overlaid with dark gray to black markings. The concealed surfaces are pale gray with black bars. The iris is bronze above and brownish red below.

Habitat and conservation
Most types were found under trash in a mesic Musa grove. The species is moderately common in suitable habitat, but its known range is very restricted. Habitat loss caused by logging and agriculture is the main threat to this species.

References

rhodesi
Amphibians of Haiti
Endemic fauna of Haiti
Taxa named by Albert Schwartz (zoologist)
Amphibians described in 1980
Taxonomy articles created by Polbot